Punar Vivah - Ek Nayi Umeed (International Title: Married Again-a new hope) is an Indian Hindi-language soap opera that aired on Zee TV. It replaced Punar Vivaah and premiered on 20 May 2013 airing on weekdays. It went off air on 29 November 2013.

Plot summary

Two individuals, Raj Jakhotia and Divya Malhotra fall in love at a teen age, but some circumstances lead them to separate.

10 years later
Divya is now a popular TV actress, who returns to meet Raj. She learns that Raj is married to Sarita (Srishty Rode). Divya thinks that Raj has moved and she decides to marry Gaurav (Ayaz Khan).

She does not know that Raj and Sarita, even after ten years of marriage, have not consummated the relationship.  Raj still loves Divya. Sarita challenges Divya: before marrying Gaurav, Divya has to make Raj love Sarita. Divya accepts this and comes to Raj's house to stay, trying her best to bring him close to Sarita. But the efforts fail and Divya goes away because she does not want to be responsible for breaking Sarita's marriage.

Feeling that he has been very unfair to Sarita, Raj decides to be a good friend to her and help her find happiness with a new partner. Raj fixes Sarita's marriage to Vikrant Suryavanshi (Eijaz Khan), who is a rich widower and his little son, Abhimaan, adores Sarita and wants her to become his mother. Meanwhile, Raj suddenly realizes that he loves Sarita and tells her about his feelings. She breaks her engagement and returns to Raj. However, when Raj's younger sister gets into trouble, Sarita is forced to ask for Vikrant's help who agrees on condition that Sarita marry him. Having no choice, she agrees. Raj is bitterly disappointed.

Vikrant and Sarita get married. Divya makes an re-entry. Raj visits Divya and slips an engagement ring onto her finger to prove to Sarita that he has moved on. When Raj discovers the truth behind Sarita's marriage to Vikrant, he asks her to elope with him but she refuses. Sarita falls in love with Vikrant but owing to a misunderstanding Vikrant becomes upset with her assuming she still has feelings for Raj. Raj sees the error of his ways and gets back together with Divya. Vikrant finally realises Sarita loves him but Sarita is accused of plotting the murder of Kajal and is arrested.

Vikrant realises that Sarita is innocent and helps her escape from the police. While they are on the run, they take refuge in Raj and Divya's house. Divya ultimately realises who the real killer is; Sarita is released. Vikrant, Sarita, Raj and Divya all live happily ever after.

Cast

Main
 Karan V Grover as Raj Jakhotia– Kamla and Sohanlal's son; Bubbly and Sheela's brother; Munni's half-brother; Sarita's former husband; Divya's husband; Neha's father
 Rubina Dilaik/ Parul Chauhan as Divya Malhotra Jakhotia– Raj's second wife; Neha's mother
 Srishty Rode as Sarita Suryavanshi– Raj's former wife; Vikrant's wife; Abhi's mother.
 Eijaz Khan as Vikrant Suryavanshi– Jhanvi's widower; Sarita's husband; Abhi's father

Recurring
 Shruti Bisht as Neha Jakhotia– Raj and Divya's daughter
 Eklavya Ahir as Abhimaan "Abhi" Suryavanshi– Jhanvi and Vikrant's son
 Sanjai Gandhi as Sohanlal Jakhotia– Jyoti's son; Kamla and Sundari's husband; Raj, Bubbly, Sheela and Munni's father
 Sangeeta Panwar as Kamla Naik– Sohanlal's first wife; Raj, Bubbly and Sheela's mother
Pallavi Rao as Sundari Walia– Sohanlal's second wife; Munni's mother
Nazea Sayed as Sheela Jakhotia– Kamla and Sohanlal's daughter; Raj and Bubbly's sister; Munni's half-sister; Rohan's wife
 Khushboo Shroff as Bubbly Jakhotia– Kamla and Sohanlal's daughter; Raj and Sheela's sister; Munni's half-sister
Richa Mukherjee as Manisha "Munni" Jakhotia– Sundari and Sohanlal's daughter; Raj, Bubbly and Sheela's half-sister
Abha Parmar as Jyoti Jakhotia– Sohanlal's mother
 Ayaz Khan as Gaurav Bose– Ekta's son; Divya's former fiancé
 Chitrapama Banerjee as Ekta– Gaurav's mother
 Abhishek Malik as Rohan "Guru" Dubey– Vandana's son; Kajal's former husband; Sheela's husband
 Nisha Nagpal as Kajal Singh– Rohan's former wife
 Surbhi Zaveri Vyas as Vandana Sharma– Rohan's mother

References

External links

Indian television soap operas
Zee TV original programming
2013 Indian television series debuts
2013 Indian television series endings
Shashi Sumeet Productions series